Fixx may refer to:

 Fixx (Marvel comics)
 The Fixx, English New Wave band
 Calvin Fixx (1906–1950), American journalist and editor, father of Jim Fixx
 Jim Fixx (1932–1984), American author, popularizer of the sport of running
 Tori Fixx, one of the first openly gay hip hop artists

See also
Fix (disambiguation)
The Fix (disambiguation)
Phixx, a similarly titled British pop group